Ilayaval Gayathri  is an  Indian Malayalam television series launched on Mazhavil Manorama channel on 24 September 2018. It is an adaptation of the novel 'Penmakkal' by Sudhakar Mangalodayam. Arya Parvathy and Varada were the main female leads of the show.

Plot
Gayathri, a young girl, who works as a postwoman and struggles to support her family while overcoming various obstacles that she comes across in her life.

Cast
Lead Cast
 Arya Parvathy as Gayathri
 Varada as Gauri
 Sajan Surya as Manu
 Harikrishnan / Pradeesh Jacob as Nandan
Surjith Purohith as Adv Balu
Devasurya as Shwetha Menon
Jishin Joseph as Rajesh
Kottayam Rasheed as Cornel Srinivasan
 Supporting Cast
 Vijayalakshmi as Madhavi
 Gayathri Lakshmi as Subhashini
 Manka Mahesh
Manu Varma
Sreedevi Anil
Sindhu
Ambika Mohan
Kavitha Lakshmi

Rajesh Marath Asalan
Gomathi Mahadevan
Aniyappan

References

External links 
 

2018 Indian television series debuts
Malayalam-language television shows
Mazhavil Manorama original programming